is a railway station on the Karatsu Line operated by JR Kyushu located in Karatsu, Saga Prefecture, Japan.

Lines

Station layout 
The station consists of two side platforms serving two tracks. It had originally been a side and an island platform but the centre track has been removed. A station building also doubles as a community hall. Access to the opposite side platform is by means of a footbridge. The station is unstaffed but a kan'i itaku agent sells some types of tickets from the ticket window in the station building.

Adjacent stations

History 
On 23 February 1902, the company, now renamed the Karatsu Railway, merged with the Kyushu Railway. When the Kyushu Railway was nationalized on 1 July 1907, Japanese Government Railways (JGR) took over control of the station. On 12 October 1909, the line which served the station was designated the Karatsu Line. With the privatization of Japanese National Railways (JNR), the successor of JGR, on 1 April 1987, control of the station passed to JR Kyushu.

Passenger statistics
In fiscal 2015, there were a total of 84,066 boarding passengers, giving a daily average of 230 passengers.

Environs
Ōchi Post office
Karatsu City Hall Ōchi Branch
Ōchi Library
Karatsu City Ōchi Elementary School
Karatsu City Ōchi Junior High School
Memorial Hall of Hideo Murata

References

External links
Ōchi Station (JR Kyushu)

Railway stations in Saga Prefecture
Stations of Kyushu Railway Company
Karatsu Line
Railway stations in Japan opened in 1899